Ranna is a 2015 Indian Kannada-language action comedy film directed by Nanda Kishore.  The film features an ensemble cast including Sudeepa, Prakash Raj, Rachita Ram, Haripriya, Madhoo, Devaraj, Avinash, Sharath Lohitashwa, and Sadhu Kokila. It is an official remake of the 2013 Telugu film Attarintiki Daredi.

The music was composed by V. Harikrishna with cinematography by Sudhakar S. Raj and editing by K. M. Prakash. The film released on 4 June 2015 and was declared successful at the box office.

Plot
Sharat Chandra is a rich but unhappy businessman based in Zurich. He wishes to reconcile with his estranged daughter Saraswathi, whom he expelled because she married Prakash against his wishes. His grandson Bhargava Chandra promises Sharat Chandra that he will bring her back to their home on his 75th birthday. Saraswathi has three daughters; two of them are Indira and Rukmini. Bhargava enters the house as Chandu, a driver who was appointed by Prakash after saving him from a heart attack. Bhargava tries to woo Indira but gives up when he learns that she is in love with another man. Rukmini, on the other hand, hates Bhargava and is suspicious of him. Saraswathi later reveals to Bhargava that she is aware of his real identity much before the incidents and warns him to abstain from doing anything with the intention of taking her back to Sharat Chandra.

To save Indira's love, Bhargava and his friend, Nurse Laxmi, go to a village and accidentally, Rukmini falls into the jeep due to a head injury, thus suffering with amnesia. Bhargava introduces himself as her lover for the time being, and she believes it. The trio goes to the venue; Bhargava and Laxmi enter the house. They and the bridegroom escape from there and reach Saraswathi's home after a violent altercation with the family members of the bridegroom where Rukmini's memory is revived. The bride's father Veerappa asks for compensation for the damage caused by Chandu, to which Saraswathi promises Rukmini's marriage with his elder son. To avoid complications, Prakash fires Bhargava. Bhargava later learns that Rukmini loved him from the beginning but was hesitant to express her feelings. He traps Bhaskar, a rich NRI staying in Uganda who has a penchant for women, and enters Saraswathi's home as his assistant.

Bhaskar falls for Rukmini, but his attempts are repeatedly thwarted by Bhargava. On the day of her marriage, Rukmini elopes with Bhargava. While waiting with him for the train to Mumbai, Veerappa's henchmen reach the station to stop them only to be trashed by Bhargava. An angry Prakash, with Saraswathi, arrives to shoot Bhargava, but Prakash is taken aback after knowing his true identity. Bhargava reveals that the day when Saraswathi left the house, Sharat Chandra tried to commit suicide but accidentally killed Bhargava's mother. Bhargava says that he chose to love his grandfather even though he killed his mother. Saraswathi, on the other hand, chose to hate Sharat Chandra as he injured Prakash and expelled them.

Saraswathi and Prakash realize their mistake and reconcile with Bhargava. Rukmini is kidnapped by four henchmen appointed by Bhaskar, where she narrates the story to the henchmen. Bhargava and Laxmi reach the spot, and Rukmini reconciles with Bhargava. Bhaskar's wealth is seized by the government of Uganda and he is left with the same amount with which he ran away from Prakash's house when he assisted him in the past. Sharat Chandra reconciles with Saraswathi, and Bhargava is unanimously appointed as the CEO of the company, thanks to the support of Saraswathi and Sharat Chandra. The film ends with Bhargava holding Sharat Chandra's hand with affection on the dining table.

Cast 

 Sudeepa as Bhargava Chandra / Chandu
 Prakash Raj as Sharat Chandra, Bhargava's grandfather
 Rachita Ram as Rukmini, Saraswathi's daughter 
 Haripriya as Indira, Saraswathi's daughter
 Madhoo as Saraswathi, Sharat Chandra's daughter
 Devaraj as Prakash, Saraswathi's Husband
 Avinash as Udaya Chandra, Bhargava's father
 Sharath Lohitashwa as Veerappa
 Sadhu Kokila as Bhaskar, a rich NRI
 Chikkanna as Nurse Laxmi, Bhargava's friend
 Mandya Ramesh as Moorthy
 Tabla Nani as Bhargava's PA#1
 Sathyajith as Om Shakthi
 Muniraju as Bhargava's PA#2
 Keerthiraj as Sharat Chandra's PA#1
 Dr. Nagesh as Sharat Chandra's PA#2
 Kuri Pratap as Bhaskar's assistant
 Nanda Kishore as Special Appearance in song "Seereli Hudugeena"
 Priyamani as Special Appearance in song "What to Do"
 Sonia Agarwal as Special Appearance in song "What to Do"
 Varalaxmi Sarathkumar as Special Appearance in song "What to Do"
 Nikita Thukral as Special Appearance in song "What to Do"
 Sparsha Rekha as Special Appearance in song "What to Do"

Production
Rachita Ram was cast for the role portrayed by Samantha Ruth Prabhu in the original, while Haripriya was signed to reprise the role of Pranitha Subhash. Former lead actress Madhoo was selected for a pivotal role in the film, which was originally played by Nadhiya. The team suggested her to watch Attarintiki Daredi but Madhoo chose not to, stating that she did not want to be influenced by Nadhiya but wanted to "understand and interpret the role my way". In early October, it was reported that Prakash Raj was also a part of the cast.

Earlier speculated titles for the film were Rayaru Bandaru Atteya Manege, Sanjeeva Sarovara, Rayabhaari, Bhageeratha and Bhargava. The film was named Ranna in September 2014, although the title had been registered by Psycho director Devdutta, later the title was purchased for Rs. 5 lakhs.

The first schedule of Ranna was completed in Hyderabad. The second schedule of the film began on 16 September 2014. In early October, shooting was held at Rockline Studio. The unit had planned to shoot a song sequence at Hong Kong which later shifted to Italy, owing to the Chinese New Year celebration rush at the former place. The movie was released on 4 June and received commercial and critical acclaim for Sudeepa's performance.

Soundtrack

V. Harikrishna composed the film's background score and music for its soundtrack. The soundtrack album was released on 15 April 2015 with the composer's label D-Beats acquiring the audio rights.

Release 

Awards and nominations
IIFA Utsavam
 Best Music Director - Kannada (2015) - V. Harikrishna - nominated

IBNLive Movie Awards
 Best Actor South (2015) - Sudeepa - nominated

63rd Filmfare Awards South
 Critic Award for Best Actress (2015) - Rachita Ram - won
 Best Actress - Kannada (2015) - Rachita Ram - nominated
 Best Supporting Actress - Kannada (2015) - Madhoo - nominated

5th South Indian International Movie Awards
 Best Actress - Kannada (2015) - Rachita Ram - won

References

External links
 

2015 films
2010s Kannada-language films
Kannada remakes of Telugu films
Films scored by V. Harikrishna
Indian action drama films
Films shot in Italy
Films shot in Hyderabad, India
Films directed by Nanda Kishore
2015 action drama films